QU Normae, also known as HR 6131, is a blue supergiant star in the constellation Norma.  It is also a variable star, thought to be an α Cyg variable.

The apparent magnitude of QU Normae varies somewhat irregularly between 5.27 and 5.41.  The General Catalogue of Variable Stars quotes a period of 4.818 days, but other research only shows likely periods longer than 10 days.

QU Normae has a spectral type B1.5 Ia, a luminous supergiant that has swollen and cooled off the main sequence.  Surface abundances suggest that it has not yet passed through a red supergiant phase.  Around 1,820 light-years distant, it shines with a luminosity approximately 417,000 times that of the Sun and has a diameter around 58 times that of the Sun.

References

Norma (constellation)
Normae, QU
6131
B-type supergiants
Alpha Cygni variables
148379
CD-45 10697
080782